The Marinid Walls of Ceuta are a set of walls and towers located in Ceuta, Spain. They were constructed in the 13th century during the Marinid dynasty's domination of the region. The walls were declared Bien de Interés Cultural in 1985. 

They were used as a citadel, shelter for troops that were forced to spend the night outside the medieval city. Of the original 1,500 meters of primitive construction, today only remains the western flank, with about 500 meters, several bastions and two twin towers that frame the so-called Puerta de Fez.

References 

Buildings and structures in Ceuta
Bien de Interés Cultural landmarks in Ceuta
Ceuta
Marinid architecture